My Heart Is in the Highlands is a 1975 Armenian drama film based on William Saroyan's play of the same name. The film was released on 22 April 1976 in the USSR. The film was directed by Levon Grigoryan, starring Gor Sahakyan, Sos Sargsyan, and Arus Asryan.

Cast 
Gor Sahakyan
Sos Sargsyan
Arus Asryan
Nikolai Gritsenko
Innokentiy Smoktunovskiy
Azat Sherents
Aleksandr Atchemyan
Tsolak Vartazaryan
Laura Vartanyan
Anait Topchyan
Ruben Martirosyan
Y. Nersisyan
R. Abovyan
Migran Kechoglyan
Ashot Nersesyan

References

External links

1975 films
1975 drama films
Films set in Armenia
Soviet drama films
Soviet-era Armenian films
Armenfilm films
1976 drama films
1976 films
Armenian drama films
Films scored by Arno Babajanian